Henry Alexander Shaw (born July 30, 1970) is an American chef, author and outdoorsman who runs the wild foods website Hunter Angler Gardener Cook. He is the author of five books: Hunt Gather Cook, Duck Duck Goose, Buck Buck Moose, Pheasant Quail Cottontail and Hook Line and Supper, all wild game cookbooks.

Early years 

Shaw was born in Westfield, New Jersey, the youngest of four children. He graduated from Stony Brook University on Long Island in 1992, then earned a master's in history from the University of Wisconsin-Madison. 
After an initial few years working as a line cook and sous chef in restaurants in Madison, Wisconsin, Shaw became a newspaper reporter, first for the Madison Times weekly newspaper, then to a series of weeklies on Long Island, including the Islip Bulletin and the Suffolk County News.

Shaw later worked at the Potomac News in Woodbridge, Virginia, then the Fredericksburg Free Lance-Star before moving to Minnesota in 2002 to work at the St. Paul Pioneer Press. His final newspaper stint was at the Stockton Record in California, where he worked until 2008 as the paper's Sacramento Bureau Chief.

Media career

Website 
Hunter Angler Gardener Cook, Shaw's wild foods website, began in 2007 and has become one of the largest sources of wild food recipes on the internet. It has won numerous awards, including the James Beard Award, and is home to more than 1100 recipes.

Television 
Shaw has appeared on numerous television shows, including Andrew Zimmern’s Bizarre Foods.., Mike Rowe’s Somebody’s Gotta Do It, Steven Rinella’s Meateater, and Randy Newberg’s Fresh Tracks.

Books 
 Hunt, Gather, Cook: Finding the Forgotten Feast
Shaw’s first book was released in 2011 by Rodale Books. It is a primer on the wild world and covers hunting, fishing and foraging. The New York Times praised the book: “In Hunt, Gather, Cook, [Shaw] makes a powerful argument for joining him in a few of those pursuits, if only to become aware of the great bounty that surrounds us in the natural world, even when we live in urban environments—and perhaps particularly then.”

 Duck, Duck, Goose: Recipes and Techniques for Ducks and Geese, both Wild and Domesticated
Shaw's second book was released by Ten Speed Press in October 2013. It covers all things waterfowl and was named as one of the Cookbooks of the Year in 2013 by Amazon.com.

 Buck, Buck, Moose: Recipes and Techniques for Cooking Deer, Elk, Moose, Antelope and Other Antlered Things
Published in September 2016, this is a comprehensive cookbook covering all forms of venison, and is the first book Shaw released via his publishing company, H&H Books.

 Pheasant, Quail, Cottontail: Upland Birds and Small Game from Field to Feast 
Released in March 2018, this is Shaw's third book, also published by Shaw's company. It covers all the upland birds, doves, pigeons and all the small mammals commonly hunted in North America.

 Hook, Line and Supper: New Techniques and Master Recipes for Everything Caught in Lakes, Rivers and Streams, and at Sea 
Released in May 2021, this is the latest book published by Shaw's company. It covers all the fresh and saltwater fish species, and focuses on using both to improve cooking skills fish and seafood cooks.

Awards and nominations 
Shaw won numerous journalism awards in his early career, and was first nominated for a James Beard Award for Hunter Angler Gardener Cook in 2009. He was nominated again in 2010, and won the award in 2013
 
Shaw also won Best Blog from the International Association of Culinary Professionals in 2010 and 2011
 
His work was featured in the anthology Best Food Writing in 2012 and 2013.

In addition, Shaw's foraging column in Sactown Magazine won a national award by the society for city and regional magazines in 2014.

Buck Buck Moose won Best Book from the Outdoor Writers Association of America in 2016.

References

Further reading
 Washington Post article
 SacTown Magazine article
 Huffington Post Blog Interview
 Twin Cities Pioneer Press book review
 Hank Shaw articles for The Atlantic

External links 
 http://www.honest-food.net/about
 Hank Shaw recipes for Simply Recipes
 
 
 Chowhound  article
 Long Island Historical Journal, Volume 10, Number 2

1970 births
American hunters
Living people
American cookbook writers
American chefs
American male chefs
21st-century American male writers
Writers from New Jersey
People from Westfield, New Jersey
Journalists from New York (state)
Journalists from Wisconsin
Stony Brook University alumni
Journalists from Virginia